The Pilgrim Progress is a reenactment of the procession to church for the 51 surviving Pilgrims of the first winter in 1621. The reenactment was instituted by the Town of Plymouth, Massachusetts in 1921 in honor of its Pilgrim founders. The march takes place the first 4 Fridays in August and also is an integral part of the Town's celebration of Thanksgiving Day.

Each marcher represents one of the 51 survivors of the first harsh winter of 1620–1621. The historical setting for this reenactment is taken from the account of a Dutch visitor, Isaack de Rasieres, secretary of the Dutch colony of New Netherland, who visited Plymouth in 1627 and described the Pilgrims gather for worship thus:

“Upon the hill they have a large square house…the lower part they use for their church where they preach on Sundays and the usual holidays. They assemble by beat of drum, each with musket or firelock, in front of the captain’s door; they have their cloaks on, and place themselves in order, three abreast and are led by a sergeant without beat of drum. Behind comes the Governor, in a long robe; beside him on the right hand comes the preacher with his cloak on, and on the left hand, the captain with his side arms and cloak on and with a small cane in his hand; and so they march in good order, and each sets his arms down near him. Thus they are constantly on their guard day and night.”

The line of march proceeds past Plymouth Rock and up the First Street (Leyden Street today) to the top of Burial Hill where a short Pilgrim worship service is observed on the site of that original fort/meetinghouse. The Psalms sung are taken from The Book of Psalms translated by Henry Ainsworth that was used by the Pilgrims in Holland and in Plymouth. The passages read by Elder Brewster are usually from Governor Bradford's “History” or other Pilgrim Source. This is faithfully re-lived the Sabbath procession of the Pilgrims to worship.

The order of the March

The Pilgrim Progress is sponsored by Plymouth Rock Foundation (www.plymrock.org)
This even is funded in part by the Town of Plymouth Promotions Fund

Plymouth, Massachusetts
Recurring events established in 1921
Historical reenactment events
Monuments and memorials to the Pilgrims